The 2018 World Junior Speed Skating Championships took place from 9 to 11 March 2018 in Utah Olympic Oval, Salt Lake City, United States. They were the 45th World Junior Speed Skating Championships.

Medal summary

Medal table

Men's events
The results of the Championships:

Women's events
The results of the Championships:

References

External links
 Official Website
Official Protocol

World Junior Speed Skating Championships
International speed skating competitions hosted by the United States
Sports competitions in Salt Lake City
2010s in Salt Lake City
World Junior Speed Skating Championships
World Junior Speed Skating Championships
World Junior Speed Skating Championships
World Junior Speed Skating Championships